Ziębikowo  is a village in the administrative district of Gmina Lubsko, within Żary County, Lubusz Voivodeship, in western Poland.

The village has a population of 102.

References

Villages in Żary County